Elacestrant, sold under the brand name Orserdu, is an anticancer medication which is used in the treatment of breast cancer. It is taken by mouth.

Elacestrant is an antiestrogen, or an antagonist of the estrogen receptors, the biological targets of endogenous estrogens such as estradiol. The most common side effects of elacestrant include musculoskeletal pain, nausea, increased cholesterol, elevated liver enzymes, increased triglycerides, fatigue, decreased hemoglobin, vomiting, increased ALT, increased AST, decreased sodium, increased creatinine, decreased appetite, diarrhea, headache, constipation, abdominal pain, hot flashes, and upset stomach.

Elacestrant was approved for medical use in the United States in January 2023.

Medical uses
Elacestrant is indicated for the treatment of postmenopausal women or adult men with estrogen receptor (ER)-positive, human epidermal growth factor receptor 2 (HER2)-negative, ESR1-mutated advanced or metastatic breast cancer with disease progression following at least one line of endocrine therapy.

Pharmacology

Pharmacodynamics
Elacestrant is an antiestrogen, or an antagonist of the estrogen receptors, the biological targets of endogenous estrogens like estradiol. It is specifically an antagonist of the estrogen receptor alpha (ERα). Elacestrant is also a selective estrogen receptor degrader (SERD), in that it induces degradation of the ERα.

Pharmacokinetics
The oral bioavailability of elacestrant is approximately 10%. Its plasma protein binding is greater than 99% and is independent of concentration. Elacestrant is metabolized in the liver, primarily by the cytochrome P450 enzyme CYP3A4 and to a lesser extent by CYP2A6 and CYP2C9. The elimination half-life of elacestrant is 30 to 50hours. It is excreted 82% in feces and 7.5% in urine.

History
Efficacy was evaluated in EMERALD (NCT03778931), a randomized, open-label, active-controlled, multicenter trial that enrolled 478 postmenopausal women and men with ER-positive, HER2-negative advanced or metastatic breast cancer of which 228 participants had ESR1 mutations. Participants were required to have disease progression on one or two prior lines of endocrine therapy, including one line containing a CDK4/6 inhibitor. Eligible participants could have received up to one prior line of chemotherapy in the advanced or metastatic setting. Participants were randomized (1:1) to receive elacestrant 345 mg orally once daily (n=239) or investigator’s choice of endocrine therapy (n=239), which included fulvestrant (n=166) or an aromatase inhibitor (n=73). Randomization was stratified by ESR1 mutation status (detected vs. not detected), prior treatment with fulvestrant (yes vs. no), and visceral metastasis (yes vs. no). ESR1 mutational status was determined by blood circulating tumor deoxyribonucleic acid (ctDNA) using the Guardant360 CDx assay and was limited to ESR1 missense mutations in the ligand binding domain.

The FDA granted the application for elacestrant priority review and fast track designations.

Research
It is a nonsteroidal combined selective estrogen receptor modulator (SERM) and selective estrogen receptor degrader (SERD) (described as a "SERM/SERD hybrid (SSH)") that was discovered by Eisai and is under development by Radius Health and Takeda for the treatment estrogen receptor (ER)-positive advanced breast cancer. Elacestrant has dose-dependent, tissue-selective estrogenic and antiestrogenic activities, with biphasic weak partial agonist activity at the ER at low doses and antagonist activity at higher doses. It shows agonistic activity on bone and antagonistic activity on breast and uterine tissues. Unlike the SERD fulvestrant, elacestrant is able to readily cross the blood-brain-barrier into the central nervous system, where it can target breast cancer metastases in the brain, and is orally bioavailable and does not require intramuscular injection.

References

Amines
Antiestrogens
Hormonal antineoplastic drugs
Phenols
Tetralins
Selective estrogen receptor degraders
Selective estrogen receptor modulators